The Directorate of Enforcement (ED) is a law enforcement agency and economic intelligence agency responsible for enforcing economic laws and fighting economic crime in India. It is part of the Department of Revenue, Ministry of Finance, Government Of India. It is composed of officers from the Indian Revenue Service, Indian Police Service, and the Indian Administrative Service as well as promoted officers from its own cadre.

The origin of the ED goes back to 1 May 1956, when an "enforcement unit" was formed, within the Department of Economic Affairs, for handling Exchange Control Laws violations under the Foreign Exchange Regulation Act, 1947. In 1957, the unit was renamed as the Enforcement Directorate.
Sanjay Kumar Mishra former Chief Commissioner of Income Tax, New Delhi was appointed as ED chief in the rank of Secretary to Government of India, from October 2018.

Objective
The prime objective of the Enforcement Directorate is the enforcement of two key Acts of the Government of India namely, the Foreign Exchange Management Act, 1999 (FEMA) and the Prevention of Money Laundering Act, 2002 (PMLA), and The Fugitive Economic Offenders Act, 2018 (FEOA).

Organizational set up
The Directorate of Enforcement, with its headquarters at New Delhi, is headed by the director of enforcement. There are five regional offices at Mumbai, Chennai, Chandigarh, Kolkata, and Delhi headed by special directors of enforcement.

Zonal offices of the directorate are at Pune, Bengaluru, Chandigarh, Chennai, Kochi, Delhi, Panaji, Guwahati, Hyderabad, Jaipur, Jalandhar, Kolkata, Lucknow, Mumbai, Patna, and Srinagar. These are headed by a joint director.

The directorate has sub-zonal offices at Mangaluru, Bhubaneshwar, Kozhikode, Indore, Madurai, Nagpur, Allahabad, Raipur, Dehradun, Ranchi, Surat, Shimla, Vishakhapatnam and Jammu which are headed by a deputy director.

Special courts
For the trial of an offence punishable under section 4 of PMLA, the Central Government (in consultation with the chief justice of the High Court), designates one or more Sessions Court as Special Court(s). The court is also called "PMLA Court". Any appeal against any order passed by PMLA court can directly be filed in the High Court for that jurisdiction.

Criticism

In July 2022, according to data shared by the union government in Parliament, only 23 people have been convicted in 5,422 cases registered under the Prevention of Money Laundering Act (PMLA) in the 17 years after the law was passed, which is a conviction rate of less than 0.5%. The cases by ED have gone up six times in Modi's second term, which led to accusations by opposition parties stating that ED is being misused by the BJP for their political ends.

Main Law and Act Of ED 
There are major law and act of ED:

Foreign Exchange Management Act , 1999 ( FEMA )

Prevention Of Money Laundering Act , 2002 ( PMLA )

Fugitive Economic Offenders Act , 2018 ( FEOA )

Conservation of Foreign Exchange and Prevention of Smuggling Activities Act, 1974 (COFEPOSA)

Internal Structure of the Organization
Directorate of Enforcement is having following hierarchy of the officers; Assistant Enforcement Officer-Enforcement Officer-Assistant Director-Deputy Director-Joint Director-Special Director-Director. However, with increasing workload and to adjust the hierarchical  needs other designations like additional director are also introduced. Directorate recruits officers as Assistant Enforcement Officer (AEO). AEOs are promoted to various levels of hierarchy and serve the Directorate of Enforcement throughout their career however a large chunk of officers are taken on deputation at various level and they remain on temporary basis in ED for 2 to 5 years.

See also
 Central Bureau of Investigation, anti organised crime which are international, multi-state or multi-agency 
 Directorate of Revenue Intelligence, anti-smuggling 
 Financial Intelligence Unit, anti money laundering
 National Investigation Agency, anti terrorism
 NIA Most Wanted
 Narcotics Control Bureau, anti drug trafficking 
 List of Indian intelligence agencies
 Central Bureau of Narcotics

References

External links
 

Executive branch of the government of India
Financial crime prevention
Ministry of Finance (India)
Tax evasion in India
1956 establishments in India
Government agencies established in 1956